The Continental Biogeographic Region is a biogeographic region of Europe that extend in a broad band from east to west through the center of the continent.

Extent

The Continental Region extends from central France to the Ural Mountains.
The southern part of this region is almost completely separated from the larger northern part by the Alps and Carpathians of the Alpine region and the plains of the Pannonian region.
More than 25% of the European Union is in the Continental region.
Luxembourg is completely within the region.
Large parts of France, Germany, Italy, Poland, Czech Republic and Bulgaria are in the region, as are significant parts of Denmark, Belgium, Austria, Slovenia and Romania. 
Just 3% of Sweden is in the region.

Environment

The climate is generally hot in summer and cold in winter, with less variation of temperature in the west, where the Atlantic has a moderating influence.
The lands is generally flat in the north and hillier further south, apart from the wide floodplains of the  Danube and Po rivers.

The region was covered by wetlands and deciduous beech forests after the glaciers of the last ice age retreated.
The forests have mostly been cleared to make way for farming and the rivers have been canalized, greatly reducing wetland habitats.
Pomerania in Poland and eastern Germany is still thinly populated and holds many lakes, fens and mires.
The southern part of the Continental Region has much vegetation in common with the lower levels of the Alpine region, and with the Mediterranean region.

Notes

Sources

Environment of Europe
Biogeography